This is a list of countries by pineapple production from 2016 to 2020, based on data from the Food and Agriculture Organization Corporate Statistical Database. The estimated total world production for pineapples in 2020 was 27,816,403 metric tonnes, a decrease of 1.4% from 28,216,306 tonnes in 2019. Dependent territories are shown in italics.

Production by country

>100,000 tonnes

10,000–100,000 tonnes

1,000–10,000 tonnes

<1,000 tonnes

Notes

References 

Pineapple production
Pineapple
Pineapple production
 Countries
Pineapples
Pineapples